The 1996–97 season was the Real Madrid CF's 66th season in La Liga. This article shows player statistics and official matches that the club played during the 1996–97 season. For the first time since 1977–78, Real Madrid was not involved in any European competitions due to the previous season's lowest league finish in 19 years.

Summary
For the first time since the 1977–78 season, Real Madrid only played in the domestic competitions after having rejected the option to enter the 1996 Intertoto Cup. Madrid returned to domestic glory in the only season under the Fabio Capello's reign, who, after much conflict with club president Lorenzo Sanz, announced his exit already in mid-season, choosing to return to Italy (where he would eventually settle at his old club AC Milan). New signings Predrag Mijatović and Davor Šuker played alongside main striker Raúl González as well as Clarence Seedorf in midfield. Real Madrid was nearly on course to sign Newcastle United-bound Alan Shearer courtesy of his best form at Blackburn Rovers, but due to already featuring Raúl González as the club's main striker, Alan Shearer preferred to stay in England. Roberto Carlos, Carlos Secretário, Christian Panucci, and mid-season arrival Zé Roberto were also new signings in defense. 

In May 1997, Real Madrid was began to slip due to injuries of key players despite having won 3 of 5 matches in that month. However as rivals Barcelona also slipped in early June after a loss against Hércules, Real took an advantage by crushing CF Extremadura 5-0 in the same weekend. Real Madrid eventually won the La Liga title with a record 92 points, after a 3–1 victory against Atlético Madrid on the penultimate round of the season (five points ahead of Barcelona), and thus Fabio Capello became the first-ever Italian manager to win La Liga silverware. In the Copa del Rey, Madrid advanced to the round of 16 where they faced perennial rivals Barcelona, losing 4–3 on aggregate. The Catalans went on to win the tournament, setting up a Super Cup clash against Madrid.

Players

Squad information

Transfers

In

Total spending:  €28,400,000

Out

 
Total income:    €0

Competitions

La Liga

League table

Results by round

Matches

Copa del Rey

Second round

Third round

Round of 16

Statistics

Player statistics

References

External links
 Real Madrid 96–97 bdfutbol.com

Spanish football clubs 1996–97 season
1996-97
1996-97